In mathematics, Apéry's constant is the sum of the reciprocals of the positive cubes. That is, it is defined as the number

 

where  is the Riemann zeta function. It has an approximate value of

  .

The constant is named after Roger Apéry. It arises naturally in a number of physical problems, including in the second- and third-order terms of the electron's gyromagnetic ratio using quantum electrodynamics. It also arises in the analysis of random minimum spanning trees and in conjunction with the gamma function when solving certain integrals involving exponential functions in a quotient, which appear occasionally in physics, for instance, when evaluating the two-dimensional case of the Debye model and the Stefan–Boltzmann law.

Irrational number

 was named Apéry's constant after the French mathematician Roger Apéry, who proved in 1978 that it is an irrational number. This result is known as Apéry's theorem. The original proof is complex and hard to grasp, and simpler proofs were found later.

 
by the Legendre polynomials.
In particular, van der Poorten's article chronicles this approach by noting that

where ,  are the Legendre polynomials, and the subsequences  are integers or almost integers.

It is still not known whether Apéry's constant is transcendental.

Series representations

Classical
In addition to the fundamental series: 
 
Leonhard Euler gave the series representation:
 
in 1772, which was subsequently rediscovered several times.

Fast convergence
Since the 1990s, this search has focused on computationally efficient series with fast convergence rates (see section "Known digits").

The following series representation was found by A. A. Markov in 1890, rediscovered by Hjortnaes in 1953, and rediscovered once more and widely advertised by Apéry in 1979:
 

The following series representation gives (asymptotically) 1.43 new correct decimal places per term:
 

The following series representation gives (asymptotically) 3.01 new correct decimal places per term:
 

The following series representation gives (asymptotically) 5.04 new correct decimal places per term:
 
It has been used to calculate Apéry's constant with several million correct decimal places.

The following series representation gives (asymptotically) 3.92 new correct decimal places per term:

Digit by digit
In 1998, Broadhurst gave a series representation that allows arbitrary binary digits to be computed, and thus, for the constant to be obtained in nearly linear time and logarithmic space.

Thue-Morse sequence
The following representation was found by Tóth in 2022:

where  is the  term of the Thue-Morse sequence. In fact, this is a special case of the following formula (valid for all  with real part greater than ):

Others
The following series representation was found by Ramanujan:
 

The following series representation was found by Simon Plouffe in 1998:
 

 collected many series that converge to Apéry's constant.

Integral representations
There are numerous integral representations for Apéry's constant. Some of them are simple, others are more complicated.

More complicated formulas
Other formulas include
 
and
 

Also,
 

A connection to the derivatives of the gamma function 
 
is also very useful for the derivation of various integral representations via the known integral formulas for the gamma and polygamma functions.

Known digits
The number of known digits of Apéry's constant  has increased dramatically during the last decades. This is due both to the increasing performance of computers and to algorithmic improvements.

 {| class="wikitable"
|+ Number of known decimal digits of Apéry's constant 
! Date || Decimal digits || Computation performed by
|-
| 1735 ||align="right"| 16 || Leonhard Euler
|-
| Unknown ||align="right"| 16 || Adrien-Marie Legendre
|-
| 1887 ||align="right"| 32 || Thomas Joannes Stieltjes
|-
| 1996 ||align="right"|  || Greg J. Fee & Simon Plouffe
|-
| 1997 ||align="right"|  || Bruno Haible & Thomas Papanikolaou
|-
| May 1997 ||align="right"|  || Patrick Demichel
|-
| February 1998 ||align="right"|  || Sebastian Wedeniwski
|-
| March 1998 ||align="right"|  || Sebastian Wedeniwski
|-
| July 1998 ||align="right"|  || Sebastian Wedeniwski
|-
| December 1998 ||align="right"|  || Sebastian Wedeniwski
|-
| September 2001 ||align="right"|  || Shigeru Kondo & Xavier Gourdon
|-
| February 2002 ||align="right"|  || Shigeru Kondo & Xavier Gourdon
|-
| February 2003 ||align="right"|  || Patrick Demichel & Xavier Gourdon
|-
| April 2006 ||align="right"|  || Shigeru Kondo & Steve Pagliarulo
|-
| January 21, 2009 ||align="right"|  || Alexander J. Yee & Raymond Chan
|-
| February 15, 2009 ||align="right"|  || Alexander J. Yee & Raymond Chan
|-
| September 17, 2010 ||align="right"|  || Alexander J. Yee
|-
| September 23, 2013 ||align="right"|  || Robert J. Setti
|-
| August 7, 2015 ||align="right"|  || Ron Watkins
|-
| December 21, 2015 ||align="right"|  || Dipanjan Nag
|-
| August 13, 2017 ||align="right"|  || Ron Watkins
|-
| May 26, 2019 ||align="right"|  || Ian Cutress
|-
| July 26, 2020 ||align="right"|  || Seungmin Kim
|}

Reciprocal
The reciprocal of  (0.8319073725807... ) is the probability that any three positive integers, chosen at random, will be relatively prime, in the sense that as  approaches infinity, the probability that three positive integers less than  chosen uniformly at random will not share a common prime factor approaches this value. In the same sense, it is the probability that a positive integer chosen at random will not be evenly divisible by the cube of an integer greater than one.

Extension to 

Many people have tried to extend Apéry's proof that  is irrational to other values of the zeta function with odd arguments.

See also
Riemann zeta function
Basel problem — 
List of sums of reciprocals

Notes

References

.
.
.
.
.
.
.
.
.
.
.
.
.
.
.
.
.
.
.
.
 (Message to Simon Plouffe, with all decimal places but a shorter text edited by Simon Plouffe).
 (Message to Simon Plouffe, with original text but only some decimal places).
.

.
.

Further reading
.

External links

.

Mathematical constants
Analytic number theory
Irrational numbers
Zeta and L-functions